Jefferson is a surname. Notable people with the name include:

Music
 Blind Lemon Jefferson (1893–1929), American Blues musician
 Marshall Jefferson, American musician
 Melissa Jefferson, American singer and rapper known professionally as Lizzo
 Eddie Jefferson, American Jazz vocalist

Sports
 Al Jefferson, American basketball player
 Amile Jefferson, American basketball player
 Brandon Jefferson, American basketball player
 Davon Jefferson (born 1986), American basketball player
 Jermar Jefferson (born 2000), American football player
 Jesse Jefferson (1949–2011), American baseball player
 John Jefferson, American football player
 Julian Jefferson, English cricketer
 Justin Jefferson (born 1999), American football player
 Malik Jefferson, American football player
 Reggie Jefferson, American baseball player
 Richard Jefferson, American basketball player
 Richard Jefferson (cricketer), English cricketer
 Van Jefferson (born 1996), American football player
 Will Jefferson, English cricketer

Government
 Anna V. Jefferson (1926–2011), New York politician
 Mose Jefferson, New Orleans politician, older brother of William J. Jefferson
 Roberto Jefferson, Brazilian politician
 Thomas Jefferson, 3rd President of the United States of America
 Wallace B. Jefferson, Chief Justice of the Supreme Court of Texas
 William J. Jefferson, Louisiana politician, younger brother of Mose Jefferson

Other
 Ann Jefferson (b. 1949), British scholar of French literature
 Arthur Stanley Jefferson, birth name of Stan Laurel (1890–1965), English comic actor
 Atatiana Jefferson (1990–2019), shooting victim of the Fort Worth Police Department
 Charles Edward Jefferson (b. 1860), American Congregational clergyman
 Francis Arthur Jefferson (1921–1982), British recipient of the Victoria Cross
 Geoffrey Jefferson (1886–1961), British neurologist and pioneering neurosurgeon
 Henry and Robert Jefferson, British wine merchants with Caribbean estates, subjects of The Rum Story, a visitor attraction in Cumbria, England
 Jane Randolph Jefferson, mother of the United States President
 Joseph Jefferson (1829–1905), American actor
 Margo Jefferson (b. 1947), American writer, critic, professor
 Rowley Jefferson, a fictional character from Jeff Kinney's Diary of a Wimpy Kid franchise

Lists of people named Jefferson
 Thomas Jefferson (disambiguation), various people named "Thomas Jefferson"

See also
 Jefferson (disambiguation)

Patronymic surnames
Surnames from given names